109 Piscium is a yellow hued G-type main-sequence star located about 108 light-years away in the zodiac constellation of Pisces. It is near the lower limit of visibility to the naked eye with an apparent visual magnitude of 6.27. The star is moving closer to the Earth with a heliocentric radial velocity of −45.5 km/s. It has one known exoplanet.

With a stellar classification of G3 Va, this is a Sun-like star with a similar mass but a 91% larger radius. (Cowley and Bidelman (1979) had this classified as a subgiant star that is leaving the main sequence.) It is 6.75 billion years old with a higher abundance of iron and a low projected rotational velocity of 1.3 km/s.

Planetary system
On 1 November 1999 the discovery of an extrasolar planet orbiting this star was announced. The planet has a minimum mass of about 6 times that of Jupiter and takes just under three years to orbit its parent star.

The star rotates at an inclination of 69 degrees relative to Earth. It is probable that this planet shares that inclination. In 2022, the inclination and true mass of 109 Piscium b were measured via astrometry. The inclination estimate is consistent with that of the stellar rotation.

Popular culture
In the 1983 Star Trek novel The Wounded Sky by Diane Duane, the USS Enterprise intentionally causes 109 Piscium to go supernova by engaging its warp drive too close to the star, in order to destroy a group of pursuing Klingon vessels. Mr. Spock informs the "Interstellar Astronomical Union" of the change in status of the star, and Captain Kirk experiences an uneasy sense that he may "get in trouble with Starfleet" over this arguably rash course of action.

See also
54 Piscium
Lists of exoplanets

References

External links

 
G-type main-sequence stars
Piscium, 109
Pisces (constellation)
Durchmusterung objects
0072
010697
08159
0508
Planetary systems with one confirmed planet